To Do the Will of Our Father in Heaven: Toward a Partnership between Jews and Christians is the Orthodox Rabbinic Statement on Christianity published by the Center for Jewish–Christian Understanding and Cooperation (CJCUC) in 2015. It was initially signed by over 25 prominent Orthodox rabbis in Israel, United States, and Europe, and now has over 60 signatories.

Historical background

The Holocaust

The statement cites the Holocaust (the Shoah) as the "warped climax" of centuries of disrespect, rejection and oppression of Jews. It states that this enmity weakened resistance to the evil forces of anti-semitism and the ability of Jews and Christians to engage in constructive dialogue for the good of humankind.

Nostra Aetate

The statement marks Nostra Aetate of the Second Vatican Council, which was published 50 years beforehand in 1965, as the instigator for the process of reconciliation between Jews and Christians.

Rabbinical sources
The statement takes from the teachings of Maimonides and Yehuda Halevi and acknowledges Christianity as an emergence of a "willed divine outcome" in human history and as a "gift to the nations".

The document also cites from Rabbi Jacob Emden in regards to the "double goodness" that Jesus brought to the world; The strengthening of the Torah of Moses and the instilling of moral traits through the seven commandments of Noah.

The statement cites Rabbi Samson Raphael in regards to the Christian acceptance of The Old Testament as a book of Divine revelation and Rabbi Shear Yashuv in stating that Jews and Christians have a duty in perpetuating moral values which are essential for the welfare and survival of humanity.

Jewish–Christian relations
The statement acknowledges that both communities have more in common with each other than divisions and adds that both the Jewish and the Christian communities, through a relationship of respect and trust, have a covenantal mission in working together towards the perfection and the redeeming of the world.

Critical reception
Rabbi Shlomo Riskin stated: The real importance of this Orthodox statement is that it calls for fraternal partnership between Jewish and Christian religious leaders, while also acknowledging the positive theological status of the Christian faith. Jews and Christians must be in the forefront of teaching basic moral values to the world.

Rabbi Irving Greenberg stated: We understand that there is room in traditional Judaism to see Christianity as part of God's covenantal plan for humanity, as a development out of Judaism that was willed by God.

In May 2017, the statement was approbated by Rabbi Abraham Skorka of Argentina and Cardinal Christoph Schönborn Archbishop of Vienna.

Others in the Jewish world criticized the statement stating that it was a breach on the world view and traditions of Judaism and that it goes against the Torah.

See also
 Christianity and Judaism
 Catholic Church and Judaism
 Christian–Jewish reconciliation
 The Holocaust
 Nostra Aetate
 Dabru Emet
 Center for Jewish–Christian Understanding and Cooperation

References

External links
 To Do the Will of Our Father in Heaven: Toward a Partnership between Jews and Christians on CJCUC's website
 

2015 documents
Christianity and Judaism
Catholicism and Judaism
Christian and Jewish interfaith dialogue
Opposition to antisemitism
Judaism and other religions
Christianity and other religions
2015 in religion
2015 in Judaism
2015 in Christianity